The 2012–13 NCAA Division I women's basketball season began in November and ended with the Final Four in New Orleans, April 7–9.

Season headlines
October 30 – The AP preseason All-American team was named. Three players received all 40 possible votes from the media panel—Baylor center Brittney Griner, Notre Dame point guard Skylar Diggins, and Delaware's multi-positional Elena Delle Donne. They were joined by Stanford power forward Chiney Ogwumike (23 votes), Baylor point guard Odyssey Sims (19), and Maryland power forward Alyssa Thomas (19). Sims and Thomas tied in the voting, creating a sixth spot on the team.
December 15 – The seven Big East Conference schools that do not sponsor FBS football (DePaul, Georgetown, St. John's, Providence, Villanova, Seton Hall and Marquette, collectively called the "Catholic 7") announced that they would break from the Big East and pursue other conference affiliation.  The move leaves Connecticut as the only original Big East member set to remain in the conference.
 February 28 – ESPN reports that the "Catholic 7" will launch their new conference in July 2013, two years ahead of schedule, and will purchase the rights to the "Big East" name from the remaining conference schools. Two Atlantic 10 Conference members, Butler (which had only joined the A10 in July 2012) and Xavier, will reportedly join the new Big East, with Missouri Valley Conference member Creighton also a possibility.
 March 8 – The Big East split is officially announced. As previously reported, the "Catholic 7" will leave on June 30 with the Big East name. As of the announcement, the "Catholic 7" were the only members of the new Big East, but Butler, Xavier, and Creighton were added March 20.

Milestones and records
 January 6, 2014 - Missouri's Morgan Eye hit 11 three-pointers in a game against Auburn, tied for third most three-pointers in a single game (in NCAA history).
 February 22, 2013 - Saint Peters' Bridget Whitfield hit eight of eight three-point attempts, tied for third most (in NCAA history) without a miss.
 Baylor's Brittney Griner scored 3,283 points in her career, the third highest career total in NCAA history.
 Baylor's Brittney Griner recorded more than 2,000 points and 500 rebounds, the only player in NCAA history to reach that milestone.

Coaching wins milestones
 900 victories - Sylvia Hatchell - University of North Carolina. February 7 versus Boston College.
 900 victories - Andy Landers - University of Georgia. February 24 versus Mississippi.
 900 victories - C. Vivian Stringer - Rutgers University. February 26 versus South Florida.
 700 victories - Muffet McGraw - University of Notre Dame. February 5 versus Villanova. 
 600 victories - Lisa Bluder - University of Iowa. January 20 versus Purdue.

Conference membership changes

The 2012–13 season saw the second wave of membership changes resulting from a major realignment of NCAA Division I conferences. The cycle began in 2010 with the Big Ten and the then-Pac-10 publicly announcing their intentions to expand. The fallout from these conferences' moves later affected a majority of D-I conferences.

In addition, two schools are moving from Division II starting this season. These schools will be ineligible for NCAA-sponsored postseason play until completing their D-I transitions in 2016. Finally, one school that had announced a transition to Division II, New Orleans, announced that it would halt its transition and remain in Division I.

New arenas
Coastal Carolina left behind one of the smallest venues in Division I basketball, Kimbel Arena (seating little over 1,000). The Chanticleers remained on campus at the new HTC Center.
Troy left its on-campus home, the original Trojan Arena, for a new on-campus venue also named Trojan Arena.

Major rule changes
There is now unlimited contact, including text messaging, allowed between college coaches and a prospective player in high school and junior college recruiting.

Season outlook

Pre-season polls

The top 25 from the AP and ESPN/USA Today Coaches Polls.

Regular season
A number of early-season tournaments marked the beginning of the college basketball season.

Early-season tournaments

Conference winners and tournaments
Thirty athletic conferences each end their regular seasons with a single-elimination tournament. The teams in each conference that win their regular season title are given the number one seed in each tournament. The winners of these tournaments receive automatic invitations to the 2013 NCAA Men's Division I Basketball Tournament. The Ivy League does not have a conference tournament, instead giving their automatic invitation to their regular season champion.  As of 2013, the Great West Conference does not have an automatic bid to the NCAA Men or Women's College Tournament.

Statistical leaders

Postseason tournaments

NCAA tournament

Final Four – New Orleans Arena, New Orleans, Louisiana

Tournament upsets
For this list, a "major upset" is defined as a win by a team seeded 7 or more spots below its defeated opponent.

Women's National Invitation tournament

After the NCAA Tournament field is announced, 64 teams were invited to participate in the Women's National Invitation Tournament. The tournament began on March 20, 2013, and ended with the final on April 6. Unlike the men's National Invitation Tournament, whose semifinals and finals are held at Madison Square Garden, the WNIT holds all of its games at campus sites.

WNIT Semifinals and Final
Played at campus sites

Award winners

Consensus All-American teams

The following players are recognized as the 2013 Consensus All-Americans:

Major player of the year awards
Wooden Award:Brittney Griner
Naismith Award: Brittney Griner
Associated Press Player of the Year: Brittney Griner, Baylor
Wade Trophy: Brittney Griner

Major freshman of the year awards
USBWA National Freshman of the Year (USBWA): Jewell Loyd

Major coach of the year awards
Associated Press Coach of the Year: Muffet McGraw, Notre Dame
Naismith College Coach of the Year: Muffet McGraw
WBCA National Coach of the Year: Muffet McGraw

Other major awards
Nancy Lieberman Award (best point guard): Skylar Diggins
Frances Pomeroy Naismith Award (best senior 5'8"/1.78 m or shorter): Alex Bentley, Penn State
Senior CLASS Award (top senior): Elena Delle Donne
Maggie Dixon Award (top first-year head coach): Holly Warlick
Academic All-American of the Year (Top scholar-athlete): Elena Delle Donne, Delaware
Elite 89 Award (Top GPA among upperclass players at Final Four): Jude Schimmel, Louisville

Coaching changes
A number of teams changed coaches during and after the season.

References